New Scandinavian Cooking is a Scandinavian cooking show which, over the course of ten seasons, was hosted by Andreas Viestad, Tina Nordström, and Claus Meyer, produced by the Norwegian production company Tellus Works Television AS in collaboration with American Public Television (APT). A sequel series titled Perfect Day continued with the original hosts in rotation, with the cast addition of Sara La Fountain. It is also broadcast on channels such as AFC.

Beginning in 2003, the show debuted on PBS in the United States (72% of the 347 regional PBS channels). It has also been broadcast in more than 130 other countries, including the United Kingdom, China, Germany, Italy, and France, to a viewership of 100 million per episode, according to show producers. The first, second, fourth, fifth, and sixth seasons were hosted by Norwegian food writer Andreas Viestad, the third season by Swedish chef and television personality Tina Nordström, and the fifth season was hosted by Danish chef and cookbook author Claus Meyer. The sixth season, a sequel series titled Perfect Day rotated the original hosts Viestad, Nordström, and Meyer, with the addition of Finnish TV chef Sara La Fountain. The seventh season was once again named New Scandinavian Cooking, and still rotated between the Nordic hosts. During the eight and ninth seasons Andreas continued the series on his own, with his storytelling, fusing history, nature, and cooking – seeking out the origins of the food with his mobile kitchen. In season 10 which was broadcast in 2013, the last of the Nordic countries was introduced to the series namely Iceland, the land of fire and ice. The season 11 (2014) reintroduces Swedish chef Tina Nordström in rotation with Norwegian chef Andreas Viestad.

On September 15, 2020, New Scandinavian Cooking officially announced Christer Rødseth as the new host of the program beginning with the show's 16th season currently in production.

The success of the series is in part due to its original format, its hosts and the series production teams. The food is not prepared in a studio but executed on location outdoors, at a mobile kitchen often situated in faraway places, such as remote beaches or mountain precipices. The hosts showcase different regions and dishes of Norway, Sweden, Denmark, Finland, Iceland, and Greenland.

The show has its own streaming service on Vimeo. In addition, select episodes can also be streamed on Amazon Prime Video.

References

External links
 
 New Scandinavian Cooking on Instagram
 New Scandinavian Cooking on Facebook
 Perfect Day official site
 

2003 American television series debuts
2000s American cooking television series
Food travelogue television series
PBS original programming
2010s American cooking television series
Television shows filmed in Norway
Television shows filmed in Sweden
Television shows filmed in Denmark
Television shows filmed in Finland
Television shows filmed in Iceland
Television shows filmed in Greenland